Momodou is a Gambian given name that may refer to:
Momodou Alieu Bah, Gambian senior army officer 
Momodou Baboucar Njie (1929–2009), Gambian politician
Momodou Ceesay (born 1988), Gambian football striker 
Momodou Ceesay (artist) (born 1945), Gambian fine artist and writer 
Momodou L. K. Sanneh (born 1942), Gambian politician 
Momodou Malcolm Jallow (born 1975), Gambian-born Swedish politician 
Momodou Lamin Sedat Jobe (born 1944), foreign minister of The Gambia 

African masculine given names